The Navy Swings is a live performance album by pianist Vince Guaraldi and guitarist Bola Sete, released in April 2010 by V.A.G. Publishing. The release contains four separate 15-minute Go Navy! The Navy Swings radio shows performed for the U.S. Navy during May and June 1965.

Background
Go Navy! The Navy Swings was a weekly, jazz-themed, 15-minute public service radio show broadcast between 1957 and 1970. Hosting duties were split between George Fenneman, Jack Haskell and Don Wilson, each who introduced the weekly guests and allowed them to perform a short concert consisting of three or four songs. The performance then concluded with a message from a U.S. Navy recruiter. The Vince Guaraldi Trio and Bola Sete recorded four separate performances for the series.

Track listing

Personnel 
Credits adapted from CD liner notes.
 Bola Sete – guitar
 Don Wilson  – Master of Ceremonies

Vince Guaraldi Trio
 Vince Guaraldi – piano
 Tom Beeson – double bass
 Lee Charlton – drums

References

External links 
 The Navy Swings at Discogs

2010 live albums
Collaborative albums
Vince Guaraldi live albums
Bola Sete live albums